Cold Tracks is a 1962 Norwegian drama film directed by Arne Skouen. The film was selected as the Norwegian entry for the Best Foreign Language Film at the 35th Academy Awards, but was not accepted as a nominee. It was also entered into the 3rd Moscow International Film Festival.

Cast
 Toralv Maurstad as Oddmund
 Henny Moan as Ragnhild
 Alf Malland as Tormod
 Ragnhild Hald
 Sverre Holm
 Egil Lorck
 Lasse Næss
 Siv Skjønberg

See also
 List of submissions to the 35th Academy Awards for Best Foreign Language Film
 List of Norwegian submissions for the Academy Award for Best Foreign Language Film

References

External links
 

1962 films
1960s Norwegian-language films
1962 drama films
Films directed by Arne Skouen
Norwegian drama films